Frank Chapman may refer to:
 Frank Chapman (attorney), (born 1950), American attorney who served in the Wyoming House of Representatives
 Frank Chapman (baseball) (1861–1937), American baseball player once known as Fred Chapman
 Sir Frank Chapman (businessman) (born 1953), CEO of BG Group
 Frank Chapman (ornithologist) (1864–1945), American ornithologist
 Frank Chapman (priest) (1831–1924), Anglican priest
 Frank H. Chapman (1851–1923), American public official from Vermont